Otto Ohlsson also known as Otto Olsson (born 29 September 1894 Helsingborg, Sweden - died 31 July 1944) was a Swedish former football referee.

Career 
He officiated 19 international matches and was FIFA referee in 1924–1937. A match in Olympic Games 1936 quarter final, a match in 1934 World Cup qualifying match  and others were in friendly matches. He was also assistant referee of Peco Bauwens in 1936 Olympic Games Final Match. He totally appointed 3 penalty kicks. Most of his officiated match were Germany's match by 10 match and he was second most match officiated referee of Germany history. He officiated friendly match in 1931 Germany-Austria in Berlin which is Germany's biggest home defeat (0:6).

Below his important matches that officiated:

References and notes

External links 

 Profil - eu-football.info
 Profile in DFB - dfb.de
 Profil - www.worldfootball.net
 Profil - worldreferee.com

Swedish sportspeople
1894 births
1944 deaths
Swedish football referees
Olympic football referees